The following is a list of products, services, and apps provided by Google. Active, soon-to-be discontinued, and discontinued products, services, tools, hardware, and other applications are broken out into designated sections.

Web-based products

Search tools 

 Google Search – a web search engine and Google's core product.
 Google Alerts – an email notification service that sends alerts based on chosen search terms whenever it finds new results. Alerts include web  results, Google Groups results, news and videos.
 Google Assistant – a virtual assistant.
 Google Books – a search engine for books
 Google Dataset Search – allows searching for datasets in data repositories and local and national government websites.
 Google Flights – a search engine for flight tickets.
 Google Images – a search engine for images online.
 Google Shopping – a search engine to search for products across online shops.
 Google Travel – a trip planner service
 Google Videos – a search engine for videos

Groupings of articles, creative works, documents, or media

 Google Arts & Culture – an online platform to view artworks and cultural artifacts.
 Google Books – a website that lists published books and hosts a large, searchable selection of scanned books.
 Google Finance – searchable US business news, opinion, and financial data.
 Google News – automated news compilation service and search engine for news in more than 20 languages.
 Google Patents – a search engine to search through millions of patents, each result with its own page, including drawings, claims and citations.
 Google Scholar – a search engine for the full text of scholarly literature across an array of publishing formats and scholarly fields. Includes virtually all peer-reviewed journals.
 YouTube – a video hosting website.

Advertising services 

 Google Ads – an online advertising platform.
 AdMob – a mobile advertising network.
 Google AdSense – a contextual advertising program for web publishers that delivers text-based advertisements that are relevant to site content pages.
 Google Ad Manager – an advertisement exchange platform.
 Google Marketing Platform – an online advertising and analytics platform.
 Google Tag Manager (2012) – a tag management system to manage JavaScript and HTML tags, including web beacons, for web tracking and analytics.

Communication and publishing tools 

Blogger – a weblog publishing tool.
FeedBurner – a tool in news feed management services, including feed traffic analysis and advertising facilities.
Google Chat – an instant messaging software with a capability of creating multi-user "rooms".
Google Collections – a collections app
Google Classroom – a content management system for schools that aids in distribution and grading of assignments and providing in-class communication.
Google Currents – a digital bulletin board.
Google Duo – a video chat mobile app.
Google Fonts – a webfont hosting service.
Google Groups – an online discussion service that also offers Usenet access.
Google Meet – a video conferencing platform.
Google Voice – a VoIP system that provides a phone number which can be forwarded to actual phone lines.

Productivity tools

Google products and services for productivity software.
Gmail – an email service.
Google Account – controls how a user appears and presents themselves on Google products.
Google Calendar – an online calendar with Gmail integration, calendar sharing and a "quick add" function to create events using natural language.
Google Charts – an interactive, web-based chart image generation from user-supplied JavaScript.
Google Domains – a domain registration service, with website publishing partners.
Google Docs Editors – a productivity office suite with document collaboration and publishing capabilities. Tightly integrated with Google Drive.
 Google Docs – a document editing software.
 Google Sheets – a spreadsheet editing software.
 Google Slides – a presentation editing software.
 Google Drawings – a diagramming software.
 Google Forms – a survey software.
 Google Sites – a webpage creation and publication tool.
 Google Keep – a note-taking service.
Google Drive – a file hosting service with synchronisation option; tightly integrated with Google Docs Editors
Google Jamboard – an online interactive whiteboard that allows brainstorming and collaboration between teams.
Google Translate – a service that allows carrying out machine translation of any text or web page between pairs of languages.

Map-related products 
Google Maps – mapping service that indexes streets and displays satellite and street-level imagery, providing directions and local business search.
Google My Maps – a social custom map making tool based on Google Maps.
 Google Maps Gallery – a collection of data and historic maps.
Google Mars – imagery of Mars using the Google Maps interface. Elevation, visible imagery and infrared imagery can be shown.
Google Moon – NASA imagery of the moon through the Google Maps interface.
Google Street View – provides interactive panoramas from positions along many streets in the world.
Google Sky – view planets, stars and galaxies.
Google Santa Tracker – simulates tracking Santa Claus on Christmas Eve.

Statistical tools 

Google Analytics – a traffic statistics generator for defined websites, with Google Ads integration. Webmasters can optimize ad campaigns, based on the statistics. Analytics are based on the Urchin software.
Google Ngram Viewer – charts year-by-year frequencies of any set of comma-delimited strings in Google's text corpora.
Google Public Data Explorer – a public data and forecasts from international organizations and academic institutions including the World Bank, OECD, Eurostat and the University of Denver
TensorFlow – a machine learning service that simplifies designing neural networks in an easier and more visible fashion
Google Trends – a graphing application for Web Search statistics, showing the popularity of particular search terms over time. Multiple terms can be shown at once. Results can be displayed by city, region or language. Related news stories are shown. Has "Google Trends for Websites" sub-section that shows popularity of websites over time.
Google Activity Report – a monthly report including statistics about a user's Google usage, such as sign-in, third party authentication changes, Gmail usage, calendar, search history and YouTube.
 Looker Studio – an online tool for converting data into customizable informative reports and dashboards.

Business-oriented products 

 Google Workspace – a suite of web applications for businesses, education providers and nonprofits that include customizable versions of several Google products accessible through a custom domain name. Services include, but are not limited to, Gmail, Google Contacts, Google Calendar, Google Docs Editors, Google Sites, Google Meet, Google Chat, Google Cloud Search, and more. One Google workspace exclusive product is Google Vault.
 Google My Business
 Google Tables (beta) – Business workflow automation tool

Healthcare related products 

 Google Care Studio – tool for clinicians to search, browse and see highlights across a patient's broader electronic health record.
 Google ARDA project – stand for automated retinal disease assessment. It is an AI tool to help doctors detect retinal disease.

Developer tools 

Accelerated Mobile Pages (AMP) – an open-source project and service to accelerate content on mobile devices. AMP provides a JavaScript library for developers and restricts the use of third-party JS.
Google App Engine – write and run web applications.
Google Developers – open source code and lists of API services. Provided project hosting for free and open source software until 2016.
Dart – a structured web programming language.
Flutter – a mobile cross platform development tool for Android and iOS.
Go (programming language) – a compiled, concurrent programming language.
OpenSocial – APIs for building social applications on many websites.
Google PageSpeed Tools – optimize webpage performance.
Google Web Toolkit – an open source Java software development framework that allows web developers to create Ajax applications in Java.
Google Search Console Sitemap – submission and analysis for the Sitemaps protocol.
GN – meta-build system generating Ninja build configurations. Replaced GYP in Chromium.
Gerrit – a code collaboration tool.
Googletest – testing framework in C++.
Bazel – a build system.
FlatBuffers – a serialization library.
Protocol Buffers – a serialization library similar to FlatBuffers.
Shaderc – tools and library for compiling HLSL or GLSL into SPIRV.
American fuzzy lop – a security-oriented fuzzer.
Google Guava – core libraries for Java.
Google Closure Tools – JavaScript tools.
Google Collaboratory – write Python code using a Jupyter notebook.

Security tools 

reCAPTCHA – a user-dialogue system used to prevent bots from accessing websites.
Google Safe Browsing – a blacklist service for web resources that contain malware or phishing content.
Titan – a security hardware chip.
Titan Security Key – a U2F security token.
Titan M – used in Pixel smartphones starting with the Pixel 3.
Titan M2 – successor starting with the Pixel 6 based on RISC-V
Titan C – used in Google-made Chromebooks such as the Pixel Slate.

Operating systems 

Android – a Linux-based operating system for mobile devices such as smartphones and tablet computers by Google and the Open Handset Alliance.
Wear OS – a version of Android designed for smartwatches and other wearable items.
Android Auto – a version of Android made for automobiles by Google.
Android TV – a version of Android made for smart TVs.
Cast OS – a version of Google Cast which powers some Google Nest devices.
ChromeOS – a Linux-based operating system for web applications.
Glass OS – an operating system for Google Glass.
Fuchsia – an operating system based on the Zircon kernel.

Desktop applications 
AdWords Editor – desktop application to manage a Google AdWords account; lets users make changes to their account and advertising campaigns before synchronizing with the online service.
Drive File Stream – file synchronisation software that works with the business edition of Google Drive.
Google Chrome – a web browser.
Google Earth – virtual 3D globe that uses satellite imagery, aerial photography, GIS from Google's repository.
Google IME – Input method editor that allows users to enter text in one of the supported languages using a Roman keyboard.
Google Japanese Input – Japanese input method editor.
Google Pinyin – input method editor that is used to convert Pinyin characters, which can be entered on Western-style keyboards, to Chinese characters.
Android Studio – integrated development environment for Android.
Google Web Designer – WYSIWYG editor for making rich HTML5 pages and ads intended to run on multiple devices.
Backup and Sync – client software to synchronize files between the user's computer and Google Drive storage.
Tilt Brush – painting game for the Vive and Oculus Rift.
 Google Trends Screensaver – a screensaver showing the Google Trends in a customizable colorful grid for macOS.

Mobile applications

Hardware

Product families 

 Google Pixel – smartphones, tablets, laptops, earbuds, and other accessories.
 Google Nest – smart home products including smart speakers, smart displays, digital media players, smart doorbells, smart thermostats, smoke detectors, and wireless routers.
 Google Chromecast – digital media players.
 Fitbit – activity trackers and smartwatches.
 Google Glass – wearable computer with an optical head-mounted display and camera that allows the wearer to interact with various applications and the Internet via natural language voice commands.
 Stadia Controller – game controller for Stadia.
 Jamboard – 55" interactive whiteboard.

Models 
Nexus One – 3.7" phone running Android 2.3 "Gingerbread"
Nexus S – 4" phone running Android 4.1 "Jelly Bean"
Nest Learning Thermostat (first generation) – smart thermostat
Galaxy Nexus – 4.7" phone running Android 4.3 "Jelly Bean"
Nexus Q – media streaming entertainment device in the Google Nexus product family
Nexus 7 (2012) – 7" tablet running Android 5.1 "Lollipop"
Nexus 10 – 10" tablet running Android 5.1 "Lollipop"
Nest Learning Thermostat (second generation) – smart thermostat
Nexus 4 – 4.7" phone running Android 5.1 "Lollipop"
Chromebook Pixel (2013) – laptop running ChromeOS
Nexus 7 (2013) – 7" tablet running Android 6.0 "Marshmallow"
Chromecast (first generation) – media streaming adapter
Nexus 5 – 4.95" phone running Android 6.0 "Marshmallow"
Nest Protect (first generation) – smoke alarm
Nexus 6 – 5.96" phone running Android 7.1.1 "Nougat"
Nexus 9 – 9" tablet running Android 7.1 "Nougat"
Nexus Player – streaming media player running Android 8.0 "Oreo"
Chromebook Pixel (2015) – laptop running ChromeOS
Nest Cam Indoor – security camera
Nest Protect (second generation) – smoke alarm
Nest Learning Thermostat (third generation) – smart thermostat
Nexus 5X – 5" phone running Android 8.1 "Oreo"
Nexus 6P – 5.7" phone running Android 8.1 "Oreo"
Pixel C – 10.2" convertible tablet running Android 8.1 "Oreo"
Chromecast (second generation) – digital media player
Chromecast Audio – audio streaming adapter
Nest Cam Outdoor – security camera
Pixel – 5" smartphone running Android 10
Pixel XL – 5.5" smartphone running Android 10
Daydream View (first generation) – virtual reality headset for smartphones
Google Home – smart speaker
Google Wifi – wireless router
Chromecast Ultra – 4K-capable media streaming adapter
Nest Cam IQ Indoor – security camera
Nest Thermostat E – smart thermostat
Nest Hello – smart video doorbell
Nest Cam IQ Outdoor – security camera
Nest × Yale – smart lock
Nest Secure – security system
Nest Guard
Nest Detect
Nest Tag
Pixel 2 – 5" smartphone running Android 11
Pixel 2 XL – 6" smartphone running Android 11
Daydream View (second generation) – virtual reality headset for smartphones
Home Mini – smart speaker
Home Max – smart speaker
Pixel Buds (first generation) – wireless earbuds
Pixelbook – laptop running ChromeOS
Pixel 3 – 5.5" smartphone running Android 11
Pixel 3 XL – 6.3" smartphone running Android 11
Pixel Slate – 2-in-1 PC running ChromeOS
Pixel Stand – wireless charger
Nest Hub – smart display
Chromecast (third generation) – media streaming adapter
Stadia Controller – gaming controller for Stadia
Pixel 3a – 5.6" smartphone running Android 11
Pixel 3a XL – 6" smartphone running Android 11
Nest Hub Max – smart display
Pixel 4 – 5.7" smartphone running Android 11
Pixel 4 XL – 6.3" smartphone running Android 11
Pixelbook Go – laptop running ChromeOS
Nest Mini – smart speaker
Nest Wifi – wireless router
Pixel Buds (second generation) – wireless earbuds
Pixel 4a – 5.8" smartphone running Android 11
Pixel 4a (5G) – 6.2" smartphone running Android 11
Pixel 5 – 6" smartphone running Android 11
Nest Audio – smart speaker
Chromecast with Google TV – media streaming adapter
Nest Thermostat – smart thermostat
Pixel Buds A-Series – wireless earbuds
Pixel 5a – 6.3" smartphone running Android 11
Pixel 6 – 6.4" smartphone running Android 12
Pixel 6 Pro – 6.7" smartphone running Android 12
Pixel 6a – 6.1" smartphone running Android 12
Chromecast with Google TV (HD) – media streaming adapter
Pixel 7 – 6.3" smartphone running Android 13
Pixel 7 Pro – 6.7" smartphone running Android 13
Pixel Watch – smartwatch
Pixel Tablet

Processors 
 Pixel Visual Core (2017, Pixel 2)
 Titan M (2018, Pixel 3)
 Pixel Neural Core (2019, Pixel 4)
 Titan C (2019, Pixelbook Go)
 Titan M2 (2021, Pixel 6)
 Google Tensor (2021, Pixel 6)
 Google Tensor G2 (2022, Pixel 7)

Services 

Google Cloud Platform – a modular cloud-based services for software development.
Google Crisis Response – a public project that covers disasters, turmoils and other emergencies and alerts.
Google Fi – a MVNO aimed at simple plans and pricing.
Google Get Your Business Online – increase the web presence of small businesses and cities. Advice on search engine optimization and maintaining business owners update their business profile.
Google Public DNS – a publicly accessible DNS server.
Google Person Finder – an open-source tool that helps people reconnect with others in the aftermath of a disaster.
Google Firebase – a real time database that provides an API that allows developers to store and sync data across multiple clients.
Google Cast – a display entertainment and apps from a phone, tablet or laptop right on a TV or speakers.
Google Pay – a digital wallet platform and online payment system
YouTube TV – an over-the top internet television service that offers live TV.

Scheduled to be discontinued 
Applications that are no longer in development and scheduled to be discontinued in the future:

2023 
 Google Duo – Google Duo app was rebranded into Meet by November 2022 while the original app was rebranded into Meet (Original). The Duo Web app was soon redesigned into Google Meet Calling while still carrying the Duo domain name. Currently, Merger of web apps and Meet (Original) shutdown pending.
 Google Cloud IoT Cloud Service 
Google Street View – Standalone app will shut down in March 31, 2023. The Street View Studio app and the ability to use Street View in the main Google Maps app rendered the Street View app redundant.
 Google Currents - internal enterprise communication tool, formerly Google+ for G Suite. Planned to wind down in 2023, with users migrated to Spaces in Google Chat.
 Conversational Actions – Extended the functionality of Google Assistant by allowing 3rd party developers to create custom experiences, or conversations, for users of Google Assistant. Will shut in June 2023.
 Google Optimize - freemium web analytics and testing tool. Planned to shut down on September 30, 2023.

Discontinued products and services 
Google has retired many offerings, either because of obsolescence, integration into other Google products, or lack of interest. Google's discontinued offerings are colloquially referred to as Google Graveyard.

2023 
 Stadia – Shut down on January 18, 2023.

2022 
 YouTube Originals – discontinued on December 31, 2022.
 Google OnHub – stopped receiving support in December 19, 2022.
 Google Hangouts – discontinued on November 1, 2022 after migrating all users to Google Chat.
 Google Surveys – a survey app shut down in favor of Google Forms
 YouTube for Wii U – Shut down in October 2022 
 YouTube Go – An app aimed at making YouTube easier to access on mobile devices in emerging markets through special features like downloading video on WiFi for viewing later. It was shut down in August.
 Google My Business – An app that allowed businesses to manage their Google Maps Business profiles. It was shut down in July
 Kormo Jobs – An app that allowed users in primarily India, Indonesia, and Bangladesh to help them find jobs nearby that match their skills and interests. It was shut down in July
 Android Auto for phone screens – An app that allowed the screen of the phone to be used as an Android Auto interface while driving, intended for vehicles that did not have a compatible screen built in. It was shut down in July
 Google Chrome Apps – Apps hosted or packaged web applications that ran on the Google Chrome browser. Support for Windows and other Operating systems dropped in June but extended on ChromeOS to 2025.
 G Suite (Legacy Free Edition) – A free tier offering some of the services included in Google's productivity suite.
 Google Assistant Snapshot – The successor to Google Now that provided predictive cards with information and daily updates in the Google app for Android and iOS.
 Cameos on Google – Cameos allows celebrities, models and public figure to record video-based Q&A. Shut down on February 16, 2022.
 Android Things – A part of Google Internet of Things (IoT). Shut down on January 5, 2022.

2021 
AngularJS – Open source web application framework. Shut down on December 31, 2021.
Google Clips – a miniature clip-on camera device. Pulled from Google Store on October 15, 2019. Discontinued on December 31, 2021.
My Maps – an Android app that enabled users to create custom maps for personal use or sharing on their mobile device. Shut down on October 15 and users were asked to migrate to the mobile web version of the app.
Google Bookmarks – Online bookmarking service. Discontinued on September 30, 2021.
Tour Builder – allowed users to create and share interactive tours inside Google Earth. Shut down in July 2021, replaced by new creation tools in Google Earth.
Poly – a service to browse, share and download 3D models. Shut down on June 30, 2021.
Google Expeditions – virtual reality (VR) platform designed for educational institutions. Discontinued on June 30, 2021. The majority of Expedition's tours were migrated to Google Arts & Cultures.
Tour Creator – allowed users to create immersive, 360° guided tours in the Expeditions app that could be viewed with VR devices. Shut down on June 30.
Timely – an Android app that provided alarm, stopwatch and timer functions with synchronization across devices. Timely servers were shut down on May 31.
Google Go Links – a URL shortening service that also supported custom domain for customers of Google Workspace. Discontinued on April 1.
Google Public Alerts – an online notification service that sent safety alerts to various countries. Shut down on March 31 and functions moved to Google Search and Google Maps.
Google Crisis Map – a service that visualized crisis and weather-related data. Shut down March 30. Improvements to Google Search and Maps rendered this service redundant.
Google App Maker – allowed users to develop apps for businesses. Shut down on January 19, 2021 due to Google's acquisition of AppSheet.
Google Toolbar – web browser toolbar with features such as a Google Search box, pop-up blocker and ability for website owners to create buttons.

2020 
Google Cloud Print – a cloud-based printing solution that has been in beta since 2010. Discontinued on December 31, 2020.
Google Play Music – Google's music streaming service. Discontinued on December 3 and replaced by YouTube Music and Google Podcasts.
 Nest Guard – a security system with an alarm, keypad, and motion sensor with an embedded microphone. Discontinued and removed from Google Store in October 2020, though it will continue functioning.
 Google Station – service that allowed users to Spread Wi-Fi hotspots. Shut down on September 30.
 Hire by Google – applicant tracking system and recruiting software. Shut down on September 1.
 Password Checkup – an extension that warned of breached third-party logins. Shut down in July after it had been integrated with Chrome.
 Google Photos Print – a subscription service that automatically selected the best ten photos from the last thirty days which were mailed to users' homes. Shut down in June.
 Shoelace – an app used to find group activities with others who share your interests. Shut down in May.
 Neighbourly – an experimental mobile app designed to help you learn about your neighborhood by asking other residents. Shut down on May 12.
 Fabric – modular SDK platform launched by Crashlytics in 2014. Google acquired Crashlytics in 2017 and announced plans to migrate all of its features to Firebase. It was shut down on May 4, 2020.
 Material Theme Editor – plugin for Sketch app which allowed you to create a material-based design system for your app. Discontinued in March.
 YouTube For Wii U Browser 
 Fiber TV – an IPTV service bundled with Google Fiber. Discontinued on February 4, 2020.
 One Today – an app that allowed users to donate $1 to different organizations and discover how their donation would be used. Discontinued in January.
 Androidify – allowed users to create a custom Android avatar. Discontinued in January.

2019 
Chromecast Audio – a variation of the second-generation Chromecast designed for use with audio streaming apps. Discontinued in January 2019.
YouTube Annotations – annotations that were displayed over videos on YouTube. On January 15, all existing annotations were removed from YouTube.
 Mr. Jingles – Google's notifications widget. Discontinued on March 7.
Google Allo – Google's instant messaging app. Discontinued on March 12, 2019.
 Google Image Charts a chart-making service that provided images of rendered chart data, accessed with REST calls. The service was deprecated in 2012, temporarily disabled in February 2019 and discontinued on March 18, 2019.
goo.gl – a URL shortening service. Started to turn down support on March 30, 2018, and was discontinued on March 30, 2019.
Inbox by Gmail – an email application for Android, iOS, and web platform that organized and automated to-do lists using email content. As of April 2, 2019, accessing the Inbox subdomain redirects to Gmail proper.
Google+ – The consumer edition of Google's social media platform. As of April 2, 2019, users receive a message stating that "Google+ is no longer available for consumer (personal) and brand accounts".
 Google Jump – cloud-based video stitching service. Discontinued June 28.
Works with Nest the smart home platform of Google brand Nest. Users were asked to migrate to the Google Assistant platform. Support ended on August 31, 2019.
 YouTube for Nintendo 3DS – official app for Nintendo 3DS. Discontinued on September 3.
 YouTube Messages – direct messages on YouTube – discontinued after September 18.
 YouTube Leanback – a web application for control with a remote, intended for use with smart TVs and other similar devices. Discontinued on October 2, 2019.
Google Daydream View Google's VR headset (first-gen in late 2016, second-gen in late 2017) was discontinued just after their "Made by Google" event in October 2019. The Google Daydream platform itself is being retired also.
 Touring Bird – Travel website which facilitated booking tours, tickets and activities in top locations. The service was shut down on November 17, 2019.
 Google Bulletin – "Hyperlocal" news service which allowed users to post news from their neighborhood. It was shut down on November 22, 2019.
Google Fusion Tables – A service for managing and visualizing data. The service was shut down on December 3, 2019.
Google Translator Toolkit – An online computer-assisted translation tool designed to allow translators to edit the translations that are automatically generated by Google Translate. It was shut down on December 4, 2019, citing declining usage and the availability of other similar tools.
Google Correlate – finds search patterns which correspond with real-world trends. It was shut down on December 15, 2019, as a result of low usage.
Google Search Appliance – A rack mounted device used to index documents. Hardware sales ended in 2017 and initial shutdown occurred in 2018; and was ultimately shut down on December 31, 2019.
Google Native Client (NaCL/PNaCl) – sandboxing technology for running a subset of native code. It was discontinued on December 31, 2019.
 Datally – Lets users save mobile data – Removed from Play Store in October 2019.
Build with Chrome – an initiative between Lego and Google to build the world using Lego. It was discontinued in March 2019
Google Game Builder – A prototype program that could develop video games in real time and was released on Steam for Windows and MacOS. It used card-based virtual programming and could import models from Google Poly. The source code was released for free on Github.

2018 

 Blogger Web Comments (Firefox only) – displays related comments from other Blogger users.
 Google Portfolios – Personal financial securities tracker. Deprecated in November 2017. Reached end of life as of January 2018.
 City Tours – overlay to Maps that shows interesting tours within a city
 Dashboard Widgets for Mac (Mac OS X Dashboard Widgets) – suite of mini-applications including Gmail, Blogger and Search History.
 Joga Bonito – soccer community site.
 Local – Local listings service, merged with Google Maps.
 MK-14 – 4U rack-mounted server for Google Radio Automation system. Google sold its Google Radio Automation business to WideOrbit Inc.
Google Music Trends – music ranking of songs played with iTunes, Winamp, Windows Media Player and Yahoo Music. Trends were generated by Google Talk's "share your music status" feature.
Google Personalized Search – search results personalization, merged with Google Accounts and Web History.
 Photos Screensaver – slideshow screensaver as part of Google Pack, which displays images sourced from a hard disk, or through RSS and Atom Web feeds.
 Rebang (Google China) – search trend site, similar to Google Zeitgeist. , part of Google Labs.
Spreadsheets – spreadsheet management application, before it was integrated with Writely to form Google Docs & Spreadsheets.
 University Search – search engine listing for university websites.
 U.S. Government Search – search engine and personalized homepage that exclusively draws from sites with a .gov TLD. Discontinued June 2006.
Video Player – view videos from Google Video.
Voice Search – automated voice system for web search using the telephone. Became Google Voice Local Search and integrated on the Google Mobile web site.
Google X – redesigned Google search homepage. It appeared in Google Labs, but disappeared the following day for undisclosed reasons.
 Accessible Search – search engine for the visually impaired.
Quick Search Box – search box, based on Quicksilver, easing access to installed applications and online searches.
 Visigami – image search application screen saver that searches files from Google Images, Picasa and Flickr.
Wireless access – VPN client for Google WiFi users, whose equipment does not support WPA or 802.1x protocols.
Google Play Newsstand – News publication and magazine store. Replaced by Google News on May 15, removed from Google Play on November 5, and magazines were no longer available on Google News since January 2020.
 Google News and Weather – News publication app. Merged by Google News on May 15.
 Google global market finder
 QPX Express API – flight search API
Google Contact Lens – was a smart contact lens project capable of monitoring the user's glucose level in tears. On November 16, 2018, Verily announced it has discontinued the project because of the lack of correlation between tear glucose and blood glucose.

2017 
 Google Maps Engine – develop geospatial applications. Discontinued February 1.
Google Swiffy – convert Adobe Flash files (SWF) into HTML5. Discontinued July 1.
Google Nexus – Smartphone lineup – replaced by Google Pixel on October 4
 Free Search – embed site/web search into a user's website. Replaced by Google Custom Search.
 Google Hands Free – retail checkout without using your phone or watch. Pilot started in the Bay area March 2016, but discontinued on February 8.
Google Spaces – group discussions and messaging. Discontinued on April 17.
Google Map Maker – map editor with browser interface. Discontinued on April 1, replaced by Google Maps and Google Local Guides.
Trendalyzer – data trend viewing platform. Discontinued in September.

2016
Google Code – Open source code hosting. Discontinued on January 25 and renamed to Google Developers. 
Picasa – photo organization and editing application. Closed March 15 and replaced by Google Photos.
 Google Compare – comparison-shopping site for auto insurance, credit cards and mortgages
 Google Showtimes – movie showtime search engine. Discontinued on November 1.
MyTracks – GPS logging. Shut down April 30.
Project Ara – an "initiative to build a phone with interchangeable modules for various components like cameras and batteries" was suspended to "streamline the company's seemingly disorganized product lineup". on September 2.
Panoramio – geolocation-oriented photo sharing website. Discontinued on November 4. Google's Local Guides program as well as photo upload tools in Google Maps rendered Panoramio redundant.
 Google Feed API – download public Atom or RSS feeds using JavaScript. Deactivated on December 15.

2015 
Google Moderator – rank user-submitted questions, suggestions and ideas via crowdsourcing. Discontinued on June 30.
 Wildfire by Google – social media marketing software
BebaPay – prepaid ticket payment system. Discontinued on March 15.
Google Helpouts – Hangout-based live video chat with experts. Discontinued on April 20.
 Google Earth Enterprise – Google Earth for enterprise use. Discontinued on March 20.
 Google Earth Plugin – customize Google Earth. Discontinued on December 15.
Speak To Tweet – telephone service created in 2011 in collaboration with Twitter and SayNow allowing users to phone a specific number and leave a voicemail; a tweet was automatically posted on Twitter. Discontinued sometime during 2015.

2014 
Freebase – an open, Creative Commons, attribution licensed collection of structured data, and a Freebase platform for accessing and manipulating that data via the Freebase API. Discontinued on 16 December 2014.
Google Questions and Answers – community-driven knowledge market website. Discontinued on December 1.
Orkut – social networking website. Discontinued on September 30.
 Google's "discussion search" option. Discontinued in July.
Quickoffice – productivity suite for mobile devices. Discontinued in June, merged into Google Drive.
Google TV – smart TV platform based on Android. Discontinued and replaced by Android TV in June.
Google Offers – service offering discounts and coupons. Shut down on March 31.
Google Chrome Frame – plugin for Internet Explorer that allowed web pages to be viewed using WebKit and the V8 JavaScript engine. Discontinued on February 25.
Google Schemer – social search to find local activities. Discontinued on February 7.
 YouTube My Speed. Discontinued in January, replaced by Google Video Quality Report.
 Google Notifier – alerted users to new messages in their Gmail account. Discontinued on January 31.

2013 
 My Maps, GIS tools for Google Maps.
Google Currents – Magazine app. Merged into Google Play Newsstand on November 20.
Google Checkout – online payment processing service, aimed at simplifying the process of paying for online purchases. Discontinued on November 20, merged into Google Wallet.
iGoogle – customisable homepage, which can contain web feeds and Google Gadgets. Discontinued on November 1.
Google Latitude – mobile geolocation tool that lets friends know where users are. Discontinued on August 9, with some functionality moved to Google+.
Google Reader – web-based news aggregator, capable of reading Atom and RSS feeds. Discontinued on July 1.
Meebo – A social networking website discontinued on June 6
Google Building Maker – web-based building and editing tool to create 3D buildings for Google Earth. Discontinued on June 4.
Google Talk – instant messaging service that provided both text and voice communication. Replaced May 15 by Google Hangouts.
 SMS Search – mobile phone short message service. Discontinued on May 10.
Google Cloud Connect – Microsoft Office plugin for automatically backing up Office documents upon saving onto Google Docs. Discontinued on April 30, in favor of Google Drive.
Picnik – online photo editor. Discontinued on April 19, 2013 and moved to Google+ photo manager.
 Google Calendar Sync – sync Microsoft Outlook email and calendar with Gmail and Google Calendar. Synchronization for existing installations stopped on August 1, 2014. Replaced with Google Sync, which does not synchronize Outlook calendars, but can sync email using IMAP or POP3. Also, Google Apps for Business, Education, and Government customers can use Google Apps Sync for Microsoft Outlook

2012 
Picasa Web Albums Uploader – upload images to the "Picasa Web Albums" service. It consisted of an iPhoto plug-in and a stand-alone application.
Google Chart API – interactive Web-based chart image generator, deprecated in 2012 with service commitment to 2015 and turned off in 2019. Google promotes JavaScript-based Google Charts as a replacement, which is not backwards-compatible with the Google Chart API's HTTP methods.
Google Apps Standard Edition – Discontinued on December 6.
Nexus Q – digital media player. Discontinued in November.
Google Refine – data cleansing and processing. It was spun off from Google on October 2, becoming open source; it is now OpenRefine.
 TV Ads – Method to place advertising on TV networks. Discontinued on August 30, with all remaining active campaigns ending December 16.
Knol – write authoritative articles related to various topics. Discontinued October 1.
 Yinyue (Music) (Google China) –  site linking to a large archive of Chinese pop-music (principally Cantopop and Mandopop), including audio streaming over Google's own player, legal lyric downloads, and in most cases legal MP3 downloads. The archive was provided by Top100.cn (i.e., this service does not search the whole Internet) and was available in mainland China only. Discontinued in September, users were given the option to download playlists until October 19.
Google Insights for Search – insights into Google search term usage. Discontinued September 27, merged in Google Trends.
 Listen – subscribe to and stream podcasts and Web audio. Discontinued in August.
BumpTop – physics-based desktop application. Discontinued in August.
Google Video – a free video hosting service. Shut down and migrated to YouTube on August 20.
Google Notebook – online note-taking and web-clipping application. Discontinued in July.
Google Website Optimizer – testing and optimization tool. Discontinued on August 1.
Google Mini – reduced capacity, lower-cost version of the Google Search Appliance. Discontinued on July 31.
Google Wave – online communication and collaborative real-time editor tool that bridge email and chat. Support ended on April 30, 2012.
Slide.com  – Discontinued on March 6.
Google Friend Connect – add social features to websites. Discontinued on March 1, replaced by Google+'s pages and off-site Page badges.
Jaiku – social networking, microblogging and lifestreaming service comparable to Twitter. Shut down January 15.
Google Code Search – software search engine. Discontinued on January 15.
Google Health – store, manage, and share personal health information in one place. Development ceased June 24, 2011; accessible until January 1, 2012; data available for download until January 1, 2013.

2011 
Google Buzz – social networking service integrated with Gmail allowing users to share content immediately and make conversations. Discontinued in December and replaced by Google+.
Google Sidewiki – browser sidebar and service that allowed contributing and reading helpful information alongside any web page. Discontinued in December.
Gears – web browser features, enabling some new web applications. Removed from all platforms by November.
Squared – creates tables of information about a subject from unstructured data. Discontinued in September.
Aardvark – social search utility that allowed people to ask and answer questions within their social networks. It used people's claimed expertise to match 'askers' with good 'answerers'. Discontinued on September 30.
Google PowerMeter – view building energy consumption. Discontinued on September 16.
Desktop – desktop search application that indexed emails, documents, music, photos, chats, Web history and other files. Discontinued on September 14.
Google Fast Flip – online news aggregator. Discontinued September 6.
Google Pack – application suite. Discontinued on September 2.
Google Directory – collection of links arranged into hierarchical subcategories. The links and their categorization were from the Open Directory Project, sorted using PageRank. Discontinued on July 20.
Google Blog Search – weblog search engine. Discontinued in July.
Google Labs – test and demonstrate new Google products. Discontinued in July.
Image Swirl – an enhancement for an image-search tool in Google Labs. It was built on top of image search by grouping images with similar visual and semantic qualities. Shut down in July due to discontinuation of Google Labs.
 Google Sets – generates a list of items when users enter a few examples. For example, entering "Green, Purple, Red" emits the list "Green, Purple, Red, Blue, Black, White, Yellow, Orange, Brown". Discontinued mid-year.
 Directory – navigation directory, specifically for Chinese users.
Hotpot – local recommendation engine that allowed people to rate restaurants, hotels etc. and share them with friends. Moved to Google Places service in April 2011.
Real Estate – place real estate listings in Google Maps. Discontinued February 10.

2010 
Google Base – submission database that enabled content owners to submit content, have it hosted and made searchable. Information was organized using attributes. Discontinued on December 17, replaced with Google Shopping APIs.
GOOG-411 (also known as Voice Local Search) – directory assistance service. Discontinued on November 12.
Google SearchWiki – annotate and re-order search results. Discontinued March 3, replaced by Google Stars.
Marratech e-Meeting – web conferencing software, used internally by Google's employees. Discontinued on February 19.
Living Stories – collaboration with The New York Times and The Washington Post for presenting news. Discontinued in February 2010.

2009 
 Audio Ads – radio advertising program for US businesses. Discontinued on February 12.
 Catalogs – search engine for over 6,600 print catalogs, acquired through optical character recognition. Discontinued in January.
Dodgeball – social networking service. Users could text their location to the service, which would then notify them of nearby people or events of interest. Replaced by Google Latitude.
Google Mashup Editor – web mashup creation with publishing, syntax highlighting, debugging. Discontinued in July, 2009; migrated to Google App Engine.
Google Ride Finder – taxi and shuttle search service, using real time position of vehicles in 14 U.S. cities. Used the Google Maps interface and cooperated with any car service that wished to participate. Discontinued in October, 2009.
 Shared Stuff – web page sharing system, incorporating a bookmarklet to share pages, and a page to view the most popular shared items. Pages could be shared through third-party applications such as Delicious or Facebook. Discontinued on March 30, 2009.

2008 
Google Lively – 3D animated chat. Discontinued December 31, 2008.
SearchMash – search engine to "test innovative user interfaces". Discontinued on November 24, 2008.
Google Page Creator – webpage publishing program that could be used to create pages and to host them on Google servers. Discontinued on September 9, 2008, with all existing content gradually transferring to Google Sites through 2009.
Send to Phone – send links and other information from Firefox to their phone by text message. Discontinued on August 28, 2008, replaced by Google Chrome to Phone.
Google Browser Sync (Mozilla Firefox) – allowed Firefox users to synchronize settings across multiple computers. Discontinued in June, 2008.
Hello – send images across the Internet and publish them to blogs. Discontinued on May 15, 2008.
Web Accelerator – increased load speed of web pages. No longer available for, or supported by, Google as of January 20, 2008.

2007 
 Google Video Player – a video player that played back files in Google's own .gvi format and supported playlists in .gvp format. Shut down on August 17, 2007, due to Google's acquisition of YouTube.
 Google Video Marketplace – discontinued on August 15, 2007.
 Google Click-to-Call – allowed a user to speak directly over the phone without charge to businesses found on Google search results pages. Discontinued on July 20, 2007.
 Related Links – links to information related to a website's content. Discontinued on April 30, 2007.
 Public Service Search – non-commercial organization service, which included Google Site Search, traffic reports and unlimited search queries. Discontinued on February 13, 2007, replaced by Google Custom Search.

2006 
 Google Answers – online knowledge market that allowed users to post bounties for well-researched answers to their queries. Discontinued on November 28, 2006; still accessible (read-only).
 Writely – web-based word processor. On October 10, 2006, Writely was merged into Google Docs & Spreadsheets.
 Google Deskbar – desktop bar with a built-in mini browser. Replaced by a similar feature in Google Desktop. Discontinued May 8, 2006.

See also 

 Outline of Google
 History of Google
 List of mergers and acquisitions by Alphabet
 Google's hoaxes
 X Development
 Google.org

References

External links 
 List of products on the Google corporate site
List of products on Google Developers

Mobile software
Google
Computing-related lists
Google products
Products
Google
Google